Minuscule 427 (in the Gregory-Aland numbering), Θε305 (in the Soden numbering), is a Greek minuscule manuscript of the New Testament on parchment. Palaeographically, it has been assigned to the 13th century. 
It has marginalia.

Description 

The codex contains the text of the Gospel of Luke and Gospel of Mark on 140 parchment leaves. It is written in one column and 34 lines per page.

The text is divided according to the Ammonian Sections (in Mark 240 Sections, the last in 16:20), whose numbers are given at the margin. There are no references to the Eusebian Canons.

Text 

The Greek text of the codex is predominantly mixed with the Byzantine element. Kurt Aland did not place it in any Category.
According to the Claremont Profile Method it represents textual family Kx in Luke 10. In Luke 1 it has mixed text, in Luke 20 it has mixture of the Byzantine text-types.

History 

The manuscript was written by one Maurus. It was added to the list of New Testament manuscripts by Scholz.
C. R. Gregory saw it in 1887.

Formerly the manuscript was held in Augsburg. It is currently housed at the Bavarian State Library (Gr. 465) in Munich.

See also 

 List of New Testament minuscules
 Biblical manuscript
 Textual criticism
 Minuscule 428

References

Further reading

External links 
 Minuscule 427 at the CSNTM

Greek New Testament minuscules
13th-century biblical manuscripts